Emil Paul Tscherrig (born 3 February 1947) is a Swiss prelate of the Catholic Church who has spent his career in the diplomatic service of the Holy See. He became an archbishop in 1996 and has since held assignments as Apostolic Nuncio to several countries, most recently to Italy and San Marino.

Biography
He was born in Unterems on 3 February 1947, the eldest of eight children. He was ordained a priest on 11 April 1974 for the Diocese of Sion.

He entered the diplomatic service of the Holy See in 1978. In addition to overseas assignments, he also worked in Rome in the Secretariat of State from 1985 to 1996, assisting in preparations for Pope John Paul's international trips.

On 4 May 1996, Pope John Paul II named him titular archbishop of Voli and appointed him Apostolic Nuncio to Burundi. He received his episcopal consecration from Cardinal Angelo Sodano on 27 June.

On 8 July 2000, John Paul named him Delegate to the Antilles and Nuncio to Trinidad and Tobago, Dominica, Jamaica, Grenada, Guyana, Saint Lucia, Saint Vincent and Grenadines, and Bahamas. On 20 January 2001, John Paul named him Nuncio to Barbados, Antigua and Barbuda, and Suriname as well. On 1 June 2001, he was made Nuncio to Saint Kitts and Nevis as well.

On 22 May 2004 he was named Nuncio to Korea and on 17 June Nuncio to Mongolia as well.

On 26 January 2008 Pope Benedict XVI named him Nuncio to Sweden, Denmark, Finland, Iceland, and Norway.

On 5 January 2012 he was named Nuncio to Argentina. On the night of his election to the papacy, Pope Francis called Tscherrig to ask him to inform the Argentine Catholic hierarchy and community that they could miss his investiture as Bishop of Rome and instead perform an act of charity with the money they would have spent.

On 12 September 2017, Pope Francis named him Nuncio to Italy and San Marino. He was the first non-Italian ever to hold the position of Apostolic Nuncio to Italy.

See also
 List of heads of the diplomatic missions of the Holy See

References

External links

Archbishop Emil Paul Tscherrig at Catholic Hierarchy 

1947 births
Living people
Pontifical Ecclesiastical Academy alumni
Swiss Roman Catholic bishops
Apostolic Nuncios to Sweden
Apostolic Nuncios to Denmark
Apostolic Nuncios to Finland
Apostolic Nuncios to Iceland
Apostolic Nuncios to Norway
Apostolic Nuncios to Burundi
Apostolic Nuncios to South Korea
Apostolic Nuncios to Mongolia
Apostolic Nuncios to Argentina
Apostolic Nuncios to Italy
Apostolic Nuncios to Barbados
Apostolic Nuncios to Antigua and Barbuda
Apostolic Nuncios to the Bahamas
Apostolic Nuncios to Dominica
Apostolic Nuncios to Jamaica
Apostolic Nuncios to Grenada
Apostolic Nuncios to Guyana
Apostolic Nuncios to Saint Kitts and Nevis
Apostolic Nuncios to Saint Lucia
Apostolic Nuncios to Suriname
Apostolic Nuncios to Saint Vincent and the Grenadines
Apostolic Nuncios to Trinidad and Tobago